The Buzzard Roost Trail is a hiking trail in Southern Indiana, north of the community of Magnet, Indiana. It is part of the Hoosier National Forest and is maintained by the USDA Forest Service.

The trail begins on a bluff overlooking the Ohio River. From there a steep trail ascends through a hardwood forest to a rocky stream that runs into the river with waterfalls and large sandstone outcrops. The trail is approximately 0.8 miles (1.3 km) long. The overlook area has primitive camping and picnic facilities.
it has multiple trails with many small caves.

References

Hiking trails in Indiana
Protected areas of Perry County, Indiana
Hoosier National Forest